The Galerie d'Art Contemporain Mohamed Drissi, formerly the Museum of Contemporary Art or Musée d' Art Contemporain, is a museum in Tangier, Morocco, housed in the building of the former British consulate near the Church of St. Andrew.

The museum opened in 1986. After a redevelopment in 2006 the museum was renamed and re-opened on April 12, 2007, under its current name. It shows mainly traveling exhibitions.

References

External links
Flickr images

1986 establishments in Morocco
Art museums established in 1986
Art museums and galleries in Morocco
Contemporary art galleries in Africa
Buildings and structures in Tangier
Tourist attractions in Tangier
Arab art scene
20th-century architecture in Morocco